Marcel Horsch (born 1889, date of death unknown) was a Belgian weightlifter. He competed in the men's middleweight event at the 1924 Summer Olympics.

References

External links
 

1889 births
Year of death missing
Belgian male weightlifters
Olympic weightlifters of Belgium
Weightlifters at the 1924 Summer Olympics
Place of birth missing